Ibrahim Amir (born 9 December 1967) is a Maldivian singer.

Early life and career
Ibrahim Amir was born and raised in the "Amir family" where several artists including Ahmed Amir and Fazeela Amir were brought up and "ruled" the local music industry. His talent was first recognized with the album Hiyy Fahi (1993) followed by several other duets with his sister Fazeela Amir. His songs from the album Fashuvi and Sameydhaan were particularly praised by music critics. Throughout his career, Amir recorded maximum songs with Fazeela and was more involved with the studio albums than film songs. In 2006, Amir stopped singing for albums and films and chose to make his "life busy with family plans". Amir was nominated as the "Most Entertaining Male Vocalist". in the SunFM Awards 2010, an award ceremony launched by Sun Media Group to honour the most recognized personalities in different fields. After his retirement from the industry, few songs recorded for his previous studio albums were re-released including the song "Abadhume Fahathun" from the album Giritee (1999) which was later incorporated into the soundtrack album of Thiya Loaibaa Dhurah (2018). Amir married his co-singer Rafiyath Rameeza and they have two children.

Discography

Feature film

Non-film songs

References 

Living people
People from Malé
1967 births
Maldivian playback singers